Literaturpreis des Kulturkreises der deutschen Wirtschaft is a literary prize of Germany. It was established in 1951. From 2009 to 2016 the prize was awarded in the prose, poetry, drama and translation categories. Since 2017 the award was renamed to Literaturpreis "Text & Sprache". The prize is endowed with €20,000.

Winners

1953–2006
 1953 Heinrich Böll
 1955 Ingeborg Bachmann
 1957 Paul Celan
 1958 Günter Grass
 1967 Thomas Bernhard
 1971 Elias Canetti
 1986 Christoph Ransmayr
 1998 Daniel Kehlmann

2007–2016

Since 2017

References

External links

German literary awards